Michael Anthony Pitts (September 25, 1960 – November 4, 2021) was an American professional football player who was a defensive end in the National Football League (NFL) for twelve seasons during the 1980s and 1990s.  He played college football for the University of Alabama, and was recognized as an All-American.  He was selected in the first round of the 1983 NFL Draft, and played professionally for the Atlanta Falcons, Philadelphia Eagles, and New England Patriots of the NFL.

References

1960 births
2021 deaths
Alabama Crimson Tide football players
All-American college football players
American football defensive ends
American football defensive tackles
Atlanta Falcons players
New England Patriots players
Players of American football from Baltimore
Philadelphia Eagles players
Baltimore Polytechnic Institute alumni
People from Pell City, Alabama